Toikeon Parham, known professionally as Ms. Toi, is an American rapper. She is featured on the Ice Cube song "You Can Do It" with Mack 10, released on the soundtrack albums for the feature films Next Friday and Save the Last Dance. "You Can Do It" became a major club hit in 2000, and its video received ample airplay on BET.

Early life
Toikeon Parham was born in Chicago, Illinois,. Her family moved to Inglewood, California, when she was 11 years old. Toi attended Inglewood High School, part of its Class of 1991. After being expelled from school, she moved to Sacramento, California, where she lived with an uncle and his family.

Career
Upon graduating from high school, she began pursuing an interest in hip hop. She also performed with a group, Thick and the Girls, initially as a dancer. Her first studio recording, "Life Styles of the Rough and Sexy", was by her and Ronnie DeVoe, the nephew of her manager. She joined a rap group, Militia, and her performance on a remix of their track "Burn" led to further opportunities.

Toi's big break came when she was invited to record "You Can Do It" with Ice Cube and Mack 10. The song became a hit. Subsequently, Ms. Toi was signed to Universal Records. Her debut album, That Girl, was released a year later. It features multiple West Coast rappers, including E-40 and MC Ren, along with others like Nelly and producer Dame Grease.

Discography

Albums
 2001: That Girl
 2007: Not Yo Average Chick - Heetseekers - Middle Atlantic - No. 7
 2014: I Am a Warrior, Part 1
 2014: I Am a Warrior, Part 2

Mixtapes
2017: Now That's Gangsta - Datpiff.com

Singles
 2001: "Handclap"
 2013: "I Am a Warrior"
 2014: "Green Like That Green" features Ice Cube, Yuck Mouth and Nyce in DJ Pooh’s movie Budz House 
 2017: "Slay" 
 2017: "Roses" featuring Klondike Kat (nominated for Female Perspective Awards Song of the Year in 2017)
 2018: "All My Life" featuring and produced by J Pad Da Juggernaut

Guest Appearances
 1999: "You Can Do It" by Ice Cube (Also features Mack 10)
 2011: "Crazzzy" by KiLR

References 

African-American women rappers
Living people
Gangsta rappers
Rappers from Chicago
Rappers from Los Angeles
Midwest hip hop musicians
West Coast hip hop musicians
African-American women singer-songwriters
Universal Records artists
1973 births
21st-century American rappers
21st-century African-American women singers
Singer-songwriters from California
Singer-songwriters from Illinois
21st-century women rappers